Volodymyr Kyrylovych Cherniak or Volodymyr Chernyak (26 October 1941 – 18 January 2021) was a Ukrainian politician. A member of the People's Movement of Ukraine, he served as a member of the Verkhovna Rada from 1998 till 2006. 

Chernyak died from COVID-19 on 18 January 2021, aged 79.

References

 
1941 births
2021 deaths
Deaths from the COVID-19 pandemic in Ukraine
Third convocation members of the Verkhovna Rada
Fourth convocation members of the Verkhovna Rada
Kiev Military College of Frunze alumni
Recipients of the Order of Merit (Ukraine), 3rd class
20th-century Ukrainian economists
People from Rivne Oblast